Graham-Laurier Provincial Park is a provincial park in British Columbia, Canada. It is part of the larger Muskwa-Kechika Management Area. The main recreation activity in the park is hunting. The park is a remote wilderness area located approximately 145 km northwest of Fort St. John.

References

See also
List of British Columbia Provincial Parks

Peace River Regional District
Provincial parks of British Columbia
Year of establishment missing